The Calling of Saint Matthew is a painting by Caravaggio, depicting the moment at which Jesus Christ inspires Matthew to follow him. It was completed in 1599–1600 for the Contarelli Chapel in the church of the French congregation, San Luigi dei Francesi in Rome, where it remains. It hangs alongside two other paintings of Matthew by Caravaggio, The Martyrdom of Saint Matthew (painted around the same time as the Calling) and The Inspiration of Saint Matthew (1602).

Commission

Over a decade before, Cardinal Matthieu Cointerel (in Italian, Matteo Contarelli) had left in his will funds and specific instructions for the decoration of a chapel based on themes related to his namesake, Saint Matthew. The dome of the chapel was decorated with frescoes by the late Mannerist artist Giuseppe Cesari, Caravaggio's former employer and one of the most popular painters in Rome at the time. But as Cesari became busy with royal and papal patronage, Cardinal Francesco Del Monte, Caravaggio's patron and also the prefect of the Fabbrica of St Peter's (the Vatican office for Church property), intervened to obtain for Caravaggio his first major church commission and his first painting with more than a handful of figures.

The Calling hangs opposite The Martyrdom of Saint Matthew. While the Martyrdom was probably the first to be started, the Calling was, by report, the first to be completed. The commission for these two lateral paintings — the Calling and the Martyrdom — is dated July 1599, and final payment was made in July 1600. Between the two, at the altar, is The Inspiration of Saint Matthew (1602).

Subject matter
The painting depicts the story from the Gospel of Matthew (Matthew 9:9): "Jesus saw a man named Matthew at his seat in the custom house, and said to him, "Follow me", and Matthew rose and followed Him." Caravaggio depicts Matthew the tax collector sitting at a table with four other men. Jesus Christ and Saint Peter have entered the room, and Jesus is pointing at Matthew. A beam of light illuminates the faces of the men at the table who are looking at Jesus Christ. This is a depiction of a moment of spiritual awakening and conversion, which was something many Baroque artists were interested in painting, especially Caravaggio.

Identity of Matthew
There is some debate over which man in the picture is Saint Matthew, as the surprised gesture of the bearded man at the table can be read in two ways.

Most writers on the Calling assume Saint Matthew to be the bearded man, and see him to be pointing at himself, as if to ask "Me?" in response to Christ's summons. This theory is strengthened when one takes into consideration the other two works in this series, The Inspiration of Saint Matthew, and The Martyrdom of Saint Matthew. The bearded man who models as Saint Matthew appears in all three works, with him unequivocally playing the role of Saint Matthew in both the "Inspiration" and the "Martyrdom".

A more recent interpretation proposes that the bearded man is in fact pointing at the young man at the end of the table, whose head is slumped. In this reading, the bearded man is asking "Him?" in response to Christ's summons, and the painting is depicting the moment immediately before a young Matthew raises his head to see Christ. Other writers describe the painting as deliberately ambiguous.

Identity of Christ
Some scholars speculate that Jesus is portrayed as the Last Adam or Second Adam as titled in the New Testament. This is displayed in Christ's hand as it reaches out towards Matthew. It is almost a mirrored image of Adam's hand in The Creation of Adam by Michelangelo, the namesake of Caravaggio. Twice in the New Testament, an explicit comparison is made between Jesus and Adam. In Romans 5:12–21, Paul argues that "just as through the disobedience of the one man the many were made sinners, so also through the obedience of the one man the many will be made righteous" (Romans 5:19, NIV). In 1 Corinthians 15:22, Paul argues that "as in Adam all die, so in Christ, all will be made alive," while in verse 45 he calls Jesus the "last/ultimate/final Adam".

Style

The three adjacent Caravaggio canvases in the Contarelli chapel represent a decisive shift from the idealising Mannerism of which Cesari was the last major practitioner, to the newer, more naturalistic and subject-oriented art represented by Caravaggio and Annibale Carracci: they were highly influential in their day.

In some ways, most of the plebeian, nearly life-sized inhabitants of Levi's money table are the equivalent of, if not modeled by, those persons in other Caravaggio paintings, including Caravaggio's famous secular genre painting of The Cardsharps (1595).

In this painting, the gloom and the canvassed window appears to situate the table indoors. Christ brings the true light to the dark space of the sitting tax-collectors. This painting records the collision of two worlds — the ineluctable power of the immortal faith, and the mundane, foppish world of Levi. Jesus spears him with a beam of light, with an apparent effortless hand gesture he exerts an inescapable sublime gravity, with no need for wrenching worldly muscularity. Jesus' bare feet are classical simplicity in contrast with the dandified accountants; being barefoot may also symbolize holiness, as if one is on holy ground. Similarly to his treatment of Paul in the Conversion on the Way to Damascus, Caravaggio chronicles the moment when a daily routine is interrupted by the miraculous. Around the man to become Matthew are either the unperceptive or unperturbed bystanders.

Caravaggio's audience would have seen the similarity between the gesture of Jesus as he points towards Matthew and the gesture of God as he awakens Adam in Michelangelo's Sistine Chapel. Following the line of Christ's left arm, it seems that Matthew is being invited to follow him into the world at large. "This clear legibility, so different from many Mannerist paintings, ... accounted for the work's enormous popularity." The position of Christ's hand, however, reflects that of Adam's in the Sistine Chapel; the Church considered Christ to be the Second Adam. But instead of being gifted life, as the first Adam was, Christ is instead the one who bestows it, calling Levi to a new life as Matthew.

Responses
Pope Francis has said that he often went to San Luigi as a young man to contemplate the painting.  Referring both to Christ's outstretched arm and Matthew's response, Francis said, "This is me, a sinner on whom the Lord has turned his gaze."

Other paintings of the same topic

There are many other early modern representations of the calling of Matthew. Two were painted prior to Caravaggio's but it is unlikely that Caravaggio would have encountered them.

Carpaccio's version in the Accademia in Venice
Marinus van Reymerswaele's version (1536)
Giovanni Lanfranco's derivative version (1626–28)
Spanish painter Juan de Pareja's version (1661) found in the Prado Museum in Madrid.
Hendrick ter Brugghen
Bernardo Strozzi's version (1620) in the Art Museum in Worcester, Massachusetts
Other related paintings of cardsharps include the Caravaggisti depiction of Valentin de Boulogne in the National Gallery of Art in Washington D.C.

See also
List of paintings by Caravaggio

Further reading 
 Jürgen Müller: Wer ist Matthäus? Eine neue Deutung von Caravaggios ‚Berufung des heiligen Matthäus‘ aus der Contarelli-Kapelle, in: Kunstgeschichte. Open Peer Reviewed Journal, 2021,

References

Sources
 John Gash, Caravaggio, 2003 
Helen Langdon, Caravaggio: A Life, 1998

External links
Calling of St. Matthew Analysis and Critical Reception
ibiblio.org
"Seeing an Old Masterpiece with New Eyes" (Elizabeth Lev in Zenit)
smARThistory: Caravaggio's Calling of St. Matthew

Paintings by Caravaggio
1590s paintings
Paintings depicting Jesus
Paintings depicting Matthew the Apostle
Paintings depicting Saint Peter
Artworks in San Luigi dei Francesi